No More Color is Swiss thrash metal band Coroner's third album, released in 1989.

Musical style
No More Color was the album where Coroner started to truly "progress", as the songs are still similar to their older, speedy, European thrash metal but start to feature elements of the avant-garde progressive thrash of their later albums, akin to the band's then-labelmates Watchtower. This album also features very proficient instrumentation and incorporation of elements from genres such as jazz fusion, progressive rock and classical music, which would later be an influence on the evolution and maturity of the experimental side of heavy metal, including acts such as Death.

Reissues
After being out of print for many years, Noise/BMG reissued the album in 2018, remastered with the same track list in a digipack cd case, with additional photographs of the band and memorabilia.

Track listing

Personnel
All information is taken from the CD liner notes of the 1989 release.

Coroner
Ron Broder (as Ron Royce) – vocals, bass
Tommy Vetterli (as Tommy T. Baron) – guitars
Marky Edelmann (as Marquis Marky) – drums, spoken word on "Last Entertainment"

Production
 Pete Hinton – production
 Steve Rispin – engineer, synth effects
 Dan Johnson, Scott Burns – mixing at Morrisound Studios, Tampa, Florida
 Karl-Ulrich Walterbach – executive producer
 Martin Becker – photography
 Micha Good – skull and blade logo

References

External links
 BNR Metal Pages' section on Coroner
 Fan page with detailed album information and lyrics

1989 albums
Coroner (band) albums
Noise Records albums